Sophie is a feminine given name, a version of Sophia, meaning "Wisdom".

People with the name

Born in the Middle Ages
 Sophie, Countess of Bar (c. 1004 or 1018–1093), sovereign Countess of Bar and lady of Mousson
 Sophie of Thuringia, Duchess of Brabant (1224–1275), second wife and only Duchess consort of Henry II, Duke of Brabant and Lothier

Born in 1600s and 1700s 
 Sophie of Anhalt-Zerbst (1729–1796), later Empress Catherine II of Russia
 Sophie Amalie of Brunswick-Lüneburg (1628–1685), Queen consort of Denmark-Norway
 Sophie Blanchard (1778–1819), French balloonist
 Sophie Dorothea of Württemberg (1759–1828), second wife of Tsar Paul I of Russia
 Sophie Dawes, Baronne de Feuchères ( 1795–1840), English baroness
 Sophie Germain (1776–1831), French mathematician
 Sophie Piper (1757–1816), Swedish countess
 Sophie Schröder (1781–1868), German actress
 Sophie von La Roche (1730–1807), German author

Born 1790–1918
 Sophie, Duchess of Alencon (1847–1897), wife of Prince Ferdinand, Duke of Alençon
 Sophie, Archduchess of Austria (1855–1857), first child of Franz Joseph I, Emperor of Austria, and Elisabeth of Bavaria
 Sophie of Bavaria (1805–1872), mother of Emperor Franz Joseph I of Austria
 Sophie, Countess of Ségur (1799–1874), Russian-French writer
 Sophie of Sweden (1801–1865), Grand Duchess of Baden
 Sophie Adelheid, Duchess in Bavaria (1875–1957), German nobility
 Sophie Adlersparre (1823–1895), Swedish women's rights activist
 Sophie Atkinson (1876–1972), English painter
 Sophie Bledsoe Aberle (1896–1996), American anthropologist
 Sophie Braslau (1892–1935), American contralto
 Sophie Daguin (1801-1881), French ballerina
 Sophie Gengembre Anderson (1823–1903), French-British artist
 Sophie Kerr (1880-1965), American author
 Sophie Masloff (1917-2014), mayor of Pittsburgh
 Sophie Mannerheim (1863–1928), Finnish nurse
 Sophie Dora Spicer Maude (1854-?), English writer
 Sophie Pemberton (1869-1950), Canadian painter
 Sophie Rostopchine (1799-1874), French writer
 Sophie Sooäär (1914–1996), Estonian actress 
 Sophie Tucker (1887-1966), American entertainer
 Sophie Treadwell (1885-1970), American writer
 Sophie von Hohenberg (1901–1990), Austrian aristocrat

Born after 1918
 Sophie, Hereditary Princess of Liechtenstein (born 1967), German member of the House of Wittelsbach by birth
 Sophie Bradley (born 1994), English footballer 
 Sophie, Princess of Prussia (born 1978), wife of Georg Friedrich, Prince of Prussia, head of the House of Hohenzollern
 Sophie, Princess of Windisch-Graetz (born 1959), Austrian member of the House of Habsburg-Lorraine by birth and the Austrian House of Windisch-Graetz by marriage
 Sophie, Duchess of Edinburgh (born 1965), British wife of Prince Edward, Duke of Edinburgh
 Sophie Abelson (born 1986), English actress
 Sophie Adriansen (born 1982), French writer
 Sophie Aguie (born 1996), Ivorian footballer
 Sophie Ainsworth (born 1989), British sailor
 Sophie Albert (born 1990), Filipino actress 
 Sophie Aldred (born 1962), British actress
 Sophie Anderton (born 1977), English model
 Sophie Aston (born 1970), British painter
 Sophie Auconie (born 1963), French politician
 Sophie Auster (born 1987), American singer-songwriter and actress
 Sophie Austin (born 1984), English actress
 Sophie Baggaley (born 1996), English footballer
 Sophie Barjac (born 1957), French actress
 Sophie Barker (born 1971), English singer
 Sophie Barker (footballer) (born 1990), English footballer 
 Sophie Barthes (born 1974), French-American film director
 Sophie Beem (born 1999), American singer
 Sophie Bellon (born 1961), French businesswoman
 Sophie Bennett (born 1989), Canadian singer
 Sophie Berge (born 1964), French yacht racer
 Sophie Bevan (born 1983), British soprano
 Sophie Bissonnette (born 1964), French-Canadian director
 Sophie Black (born 1958), American prize-winning poet
 Sophie Blackall, Australian artist 
 Sophie Blake (born 1977), British television presenter
 Sophie de Boer (born 1990), Dutch racing cyclist
 Sophie Body-Gendrot (1942–2018), French political scientist, criminologist and sociologist
 Sophie Boilley (born 1989), French biathlete
 Sophie Bouillon (born 1984), French independent journalist
 Sophie Bould (born 1982), British theatre actress
 Sophie Bradley-Auckland (born 1989), English footballer
 Sophie Bray (born 1990), English international field hockey player 
 Sophie Brown (badminton) (born 1993), English badminton player
 Sophie Bruehmann (born 1995), German female acrobatic gymnast
 Sophie Byrne, Australian filmmaker
 Sophie Cadieux (born 1977), Quebec actress
 Sophie Caldwell (born 1990), American cross-country skier
 Sophie Calle (born 1953), French artist
 Sophie Campbell, American comic artist
 Sophie Carle (born 1964), Luxembourgian actress
 Sophie Carrigill (born 1994), British wheelchair basketball player
 Sophie Casey (born 1991), Australian footballer
 Sophie Choudry (born 1982), Indian singer and VJ
 Sophie Clarke (born 1989), American reality TV personality
 Sophie Colquhoun (born 1989), English actress
 Sophie Crumb (born 1981), American-French comics artist
 Sophie Dahl (born 1977), English fashion model and author
 Sophie Delila (born 1983), French singer-songwriter
 Sophie Elliott (1985-2008), New Zealand murder victim
 Sophie Ellis-Bextor (born 1979), British singer
 Sophie Evans (born 1993), British actress and singer
 Sophie Gradon (1985–2018), English model and marketing manager
 Sophie Goyette, Canadian film director and screenwriter
 Sophie Grégoire Trudeau (born 1975), Canadian model and television host, wife of Justin Trudeau
 Sophie Grigson (born 1959), British cookery writer
 Sophie Hannah (born 1971), British writer
 Sophie B. Hawkins (born 1964), American singer-songwriter
 Sophie Hecquet (1944–2012), French singer, actress and presenter
 Sophie Hopkins (born 1990), British actress
 Sophie Huet (1953–2017), French journalist
 Sophie Kinsella (born 1969), British writer
 Sophie Labelle (born 1988), Canadian cartoonist and transgender rights activist
 Sophie Lancaster (1986–2007), British murder victim
 Sophie Lawrence (born 1972), British actress
 Sophie Lee (born 1968), Australian actress
 Sophie Ley (1849–1918), German painter
 Sophie Marceau (born 1966), French actress
 Sophie McShera (born 1985), English actress
 Sophie Moleta (born 1969), New Zealand singer-songwriter
 Sophie Molineux (born 1998), Australian cricketer
 Sophie Monk (born 1979), Australian singer
 Sophie Muller (born 1962), British music video director
 Sophie Nélisse (born 2000), Canadian actress
 Sophie Okonedo (born 1968), British actress
 Sophie Pétronin (born 1945), French-Swiss humanitarian and aid worker
 Sophie Postel-Vinay, French physician and oncology researcher
 Sophie Price (born 1989), British glamour model
 Sophie Porley (born 1992), British actress
 Sophie Raworth (born 1968), British television presenter
 Sophie Scholl (1921–1943), executed German member of the WWII White Rose resistance
 Sophie Thompson (born 1962), British actress
 Sophie Turner (born 1996), British actress
 Sophie Vavasseur (born 1992), Irish actress
 Sophie Ward (born 1964), British actress
 Sophie Willan (born 1987/88), British comedian
 Sophie Wilson (born 1957), British computer scientist
 Sophie Winkleman (born 1980), British actress
 Sophie Xeon (1986–2021), known mononymously as SOPHIE, Scottish electronic music producer
 Sophie Zelmani (born 1972), Swedish singer-songwriter

Fictional characters
 Sophie Foster, main character of Keeper of the Lost Cities by Shannon Messenger
 Sofie Fatale, from the film Kill Bill: Volume 1
 Sophie, from the book The BFG and the films The BFG (1989) and The BFG (2016)
 Sophie, a Belgian comics series by Jidéhem
 Sophie Bergmann, from the video game Fullmetal Alchemist 3: Kami o Tsugu Shōjo
 Sophie Burton, from the TV series Hollyoaks
 Sophie Chapman, from the TV series Peep Show
 Sophie Devereaux, grifter in TNT's Leverage
 Sophie von Faninal, from the opera Der Rosenkavalier
 Sophie Hatter, main character of Howl's Moving Castle
 Sophie Kowalsky, main character in the movie Love Me If You Dare, played by Marion Cotillard
 Sophie Martinez, from the TV series Cory in the House
 Sophie Neveu, heroine of The Da Vinci Code
 Sophie Newman, main character of The Secrets of the Immortal Nicholas Flamel
 Sophie Sanders, from Bunsen Is a Beast
 Sophie Simpson, from the TV series Home and Away
 Sophie Webster, from the soap opera Coronation Street
 Sophie Zawistowska, from the novel and film Sophie's Choice
 Sophie King, from the film Cyberbully
 Sophie Neuenmuller, from Atelier Sophie: The Alchemist of the Mysterious Book and its sequel
 Sophie, from the video gameTales of Graces
 Sophie of Woods Beyond, a main character in the book series The School For Good And Evil
 Sophie, from the TV series In Treatment
 Sophie, a minor character from the Doctor Who episode "The Lodger"
 Sophie, from the film Mamma Mia! and its sequel
 Sophie Twilight, from Ms. Vampire Who Lives in My Neighborhood
 Sophie Kachinsky, from the TV series 2 Broke Girls
 Sophie Elizabeth Foster, from Keeper of the Lost Cities by Shannon Messenger
 Sophie Richards, from the video game The House of the Dead
 Sophie the Sapphire Fairy, from the Rainbow Magic book franchise
 Sophie Dumond, from the film Joker (2019 film)
 Sophie, from the film Portrait of a Lady on Fire
 Sophie One and Other Sophie, from the TV series The Epic Tales of Captain Underpants
 Sophie Song, from the TV series Peacemaker (TV series)
 Sophie, from the film Bodies Bodies Bodies
 Sophie Charalambos, from the TV series Stath Lets Flats
 Sophie Lennon, from the TV series The Marvelous Mrs. Maisel
 Sophie Green, from the sixth season of the TV series American Horror Story
 Sophie, from the film Aftersun
 Sophie, from the Don Bluth film Anastasia

References

See also 
 Sophy

English feminine given names
French feminine given names
German feminine given names
Dutch feminine given names
Given names of Greek language origin
Lists of people by given name